The 1932 United States Senate election in Iowa took place on November 8, 1932. Incumbent Republican Senator Smith Brookhart, a controversial progressive figure within the conservative Iowa Republican Party, was defeated in the June Republican primary by Henry A. Field. Field was in turn defeated in the general election by Democrat Louis Murphy. Brookhart also entered the general election as the candidate of the Progressive Party but finished a distant third.

Primary elections were held on June 6. Field defeated Brookhart in the Republican primary, and Murphy defeated a four-man Democratic field including former Senator Daniel F. Steck and future Governor Nelson G. Kraschel.

Murphy's victory made him just the second Democratic Senator from Iowa elected since 1858 and the first to win election directly.

Background

Senator Smith W. Brookhart was first elected to the Senate in 1922, winning a special election to succeed William S. Kenyon. After joining the Senate, Brookhart's "pugnacious cowhide radicalism nettled patrician Senators." His indifference to President Calvin Coolidge in the 1924 presidential election also upset conservatives.

In 1924, he attempted to win re-election to a full term, and it initially appeared he had narrowly defeated Democratic nominee Daniel Steck despite the defection of many conservative Republicans. However, Steck challenged the result in the U.S. Senate and, during a lengthy process, the Iowa Republican Party sided with Steck. Brookhart was removed from office on April 12, 1926 and replaced with Steck by a vote of 45–41. A dozen Senate Republicans voted with Democrats to unseat Brookhart.

Immediately upon his ouster from the Senate, Brookhart returned to Iowa and challenged the incumbent Republican Senator for Iowa's other Senate seat, Albert B. Cummins, a respected veteran of the Senate. Brookhart defeated Cummins in a landslide, despite having little time or resources to mount a campaign, and was returned to the Senate in the fall in another landslide victory.

Republican primary

Candidates
Smith W. Brookhart, incumbent Senator since 1927
Louis Cook, member of the state board of Assessment and Review
George Cosson, former Iowa Attorney General and State Senator from Audubon
L.E. Eickelberg
Henry Ames Field, Shenandoah businessman, owner of Henry Field Seed and Nursery Co. and radio station KFNF
Glenn C. Haynes, executive secretary of the Iowa Good Roads Association and former Iowa Auditor

Campaign
The first prominent challenger to Brookhart was George Cosson, a former Iowa Attorney General. In February, Brookhart accused Cosson of being "personally conducted" by Federal Reserve Bank chair Eugene Meyer, whose confirmation Brookhart had opposed. "This is simply an illustration of the political machine Wall Street is attempting to build up for the control of all the states through the federal reserve banking system, the federal land bank system, the joint stock land bank system and the intermediate credit bank system," said Brookhart. Brookhart further accused Meyer of bankrupting the nation's farmers and proposed instead a direct subsidy. Cosson declined to respond to the accusation.

Henry Field, a success agribusinessman and radio station owner, entered the race in March in response to a draft effort by more conservative Republicans. He, Cosson, and Cook were soon joined by Glenn Haynes, a former state Auditor and secretary of the Iowa Good Roads Association. 

Eventually, conservatives joined in support of Field as the best alternative to Brookhart. In addition to traditional conservative lines of attack, Field criticized the Senator for missing sessions while on vacation and for the number of his relatives who held federal positions.

Results

Democratic primary

Candidates
Fred P. Hagemann, nominee for Governor in 1930
Nelson G. Kraschel, livestock farmer and auctioneer
Charles F. Lytle
Louis Murphy, editor of the Dubuque Telegraph-Herald
Daniel Steck, former U.S. Senator (1926–31)

Results

After losing the primary, Kraschel was nominated to run for Lieutenant Governor of Iowa.

General election

Candidates
Smith W. Brookhart, incumbent Senator since 1926 (Progressive)
Henry Ames Field, Shenandoah nurseryman (Republican)
Roy M. Harrop (Farmer-Labor)
Peter Hunter (Communist)
T.S. McCrill (Socialist)
Louis Murphy, editor of the Dubuque Telegraph-Herald (Democratic)

Results

See also 
 1932 United States Senate elections

Notes

References

1932
Iowa
United States Senate